The Cornwall Railway company constructed a railway line between Plymouth and Truro in the United Kingdom, opening in 1859, and extended it to Falmouth in 1863. The topography of Cornwall is such that the route, which is generally east–west, cuts across numerous deep river valleys that generally run north–south. At the time of construction of the line, money was in short supply due to the collapse in confidence following the railway mania, and the company sought ways of reducing expenditure.

On the advice of the Victorian railway engineer Isambard Kingdom Brunel, they constructed the river crossings in the form of wooden viaducts, 42 in total, consisting of timber deck spans supported by fans of timber bracing built on masonry piers. This unusual method of construction substantially reduced the first cost of construction compared to an all-masonry structure, but at the cost of more expensive maintenance.

Replacement of the timber viaducts by all-masonry structures began in the 1870s but a few remained in service until the 1930s.

History
The Cornwall Railway linked Plymouth with Falmouth. Although the line had been designed by Brunel, this was after his death and the construction under the supervision of R P Brereton. It was built as a single-track  broad gauge line.

The  of railway crossed 45 rivers and deep valleys. Of these 43 were spanned by viaducts of various types built partly or entirely from timber. Workshops were established at  where timber could arrive on barges to be preserved and cut to size. The offcuts from the timbers used for the viaducts and track were then used for the construction of the railway's buildings.

The choice of timber was made to keep initial costs down, but Brunel had warned that this meant more expensive maintenance—running to £10,000 annually. Replacement of the viaducts started in 1875 but led to a dispute in 1884 between the Cornwall Railway and the Great Western Railway which was leasing the line. The lease precluded the conversion of the line to  standard gauge, and the Cornwall Railway refused to pay for the widening of the viaducts during rebuilding sufficient to accommodate a double line of standard gauge tracks. Following the amalgamation of the two companies on 1 July 1889 all the remaining viaducts on the main line to Truro were replaced. Most were either rebuilt in situ or by a replacement viaduct built immediately alongside, and in the latter case many of the original piers still remain today.

Between Saltash and St Germans, a deviation line was built in 1908, eliminating the wooden viaducts on by-passed section of line. Those on the Falmouth branch were all replaced between 1923 and 1934.

Constructional features
The distinctive timber viaducts were constructed using yellow pine which was preserved by Kyanising (using chloride of mercury), or sometimes by Burnettising (using chloride of zinc, a process patented by William Burnett) in the workshops at Lostwithiel. The various timbers were seated in cast iron chairs, and wrought iron was used for parts of the bridge which would be in tension, such as tie rods between spans. Five distinct types of viaduct were built to suit local conditions at each site. Peter John Margary, the Cornwall Railway engineer from 1868 to 1891, classified them as classes A to E.

From the tops of these radiated three fans of timber struts to support the beams beneath the track; one fan on each side and the third beneath the centre of the track. The struts radiated at around 55, 75, 105 and 125 degrees from horizontal (resulting in a \\// form), although there were some slight variations. This gave piers spaced at about  centres.
 Class B: A stronger support was given to St Pinnock, Largin, and Ponsanooth viaducts by replacing the central set of fan struts with a pair. These joined the outer fans at the top of the pier and met each other at the top, giving a W form when viewed across the width of the piers.
 Class C: The soft ground of the tidal valleys at Weston Mill, Forder, Wivelscombe, and Nottar required a lighter structure. This was achieved by dispensing with the stone piers and replacing them with vertical timber trestles built on top of timber piles driven into the mud. There were no fans supporting the track, instead timber trusses were built directly on top of the timber trestles.
 Class D: Coombe (by Saltash) and Moorswater viaducts had only two fans on each pier – one on each side – but the bottoms of these were joined by laminated timber beams between each set of fans, which created a continuous beam along the length of the viaduct above the top of the masonry piers.
 Class E: The shallowest valleys at Grove, Draw Wood, and Probus were crossed by simple trestles of three parallel fans with two struts each in a V shape.

Brunel's designs allowed any defective timber to be withdrawn and replaced. The first decay usually occurred at the bottom of legs where they were seated in the cast iron chairs, and around bolt holes. The other area with significant decay was generally underneath the decking that carried the track and ballast. After World War I it became difficult to obtain the preferred yellow pine and other timber with shorter life was used instead, although by this time only the viaducts on the Falmouth branch remained in use.

Special gangs of men worked together on the viaduct maintenance. To reach timbers below the deck they worked from  manila ropes. It was possible to work on the viaduct without closing the viaduct to trains, but a temporary  speed restriction was enforced until the replacement was properly in place. The actual movement of the larger timbers was carried out on a Sunday when there were few trains operating.

Viaducts from Plymouth to St Germans

Stonehouse Pool

The only double track viaduct on the line, it was a Class A viaduct but with five fans of struts on each of the dwarf piers. Rebuilt with iron girders on brick piers in 1908.

The land below the viaduct was the head of a tidal creek but is now drained and forms a park. In 1876 a new Cornwall Loop between Plymouth North Road station and the Cornwall Railway was opened, built on a  viaduct alongside the Stonehouse Pool Viaduct. Millbay station and its connecting lines (on which Stonehouse Pool Viaduct was located) were closed in 1964; the girders have since been removed and a steel work of art has been erected in its place.

Keyham

It was rebuilt using iron girders in 1900 which were again replaced with steel in 1937.

Weston Mill

It was replaced by a steel structure in 1903.

Royal Albert Bridge

Milepost 252, immediately east of  station.

This was the largest metal bridge on the route when it opened. A  wrought iron bridge (including two main spans of ); it stands  clear of high water.

Coombe by Saltash

It was replaced by a stone viaduct on 19 October 1894. Because it crossed a deep, muddy tidal inlet, Brunel constructed this viaduct on timber piles and used timber trestles instead of stone piers. These were made from four groups of four timber baulks, each group raking inwards towards the top of the trestle.

Forder

It was demolished after the line was diverted to a more inland alignment on 19 May 1908.

Wivelscombe

It was demolished after the line was diverted to a more inland alignment on 19 May 1908.

Grove

The fans consisted of two raking struts on either side of the track, tied beneath the track by cross braces, and a central pair of struts which were joined at the top as an inverted V; from the side this gave a \|/ fan. It was demolished after the line was diverted to a more inland alignment on 19 May 1908.

A fatal accident occurred here just two days after the opening of the railway. On 6 May 1859 the engine of the 7.25 p.m. train from Plymouth was approaching St Germans when it left the rails, hit the parapet of the viaduct and fell into the mud below, landing upside down. Two of the coaches also ended up in the creek. The driver, fireman, and one guard were killed. A second guard, Richard Paddon, was given a reward of five pounds for his part in keeping the remainder of the train on the viaduct and helping to rescue the survivors. At the inquest held on 10 May 1859, the Permanent Way Inspector, the Traffic Superintendent, and Mr Brereton, Brunel's Chief Engineer, were all unable to account for the derailment, and the jury verdict was accidental death.

Nottar

It was demolished after the line was diverted to a more inland alignment on 19 May 1908.

St Germans

This timber viaduct was not included in Margary's classification system as it was not a fan viaduct. Piles were driven into the mud and the trestles built on top from four groups of four timber baulks, each group raking inwards towards the top of the trestle. Where the piers were on the river bank the trestles rested on low masonry plinths. It was not possible to remove individual timbers from the trestles, unlike the fan viaducts which were designed with piecemeal maintenance in mind. It was demolished after the line was diverted to a new alignment on 19 May 1908.

Viaducts from St Germans to Liskeard

Tresulgan

It was replaced by a new stone viaduct on 26 March 1899.

Coldrennick
Milepost 261.5, immediately east of Menheniot station.

The piers were raised in brick and new iron girders replaced the timber, the work being completed on 23 January 1898. The piers were further strengthened in 1933 by encasing them in stone.

The Times newspaper reported that it "is stated to be 134ft. high and is the highest of the whole series of bridges by which the [Cornwall] railway is carried".

Note: the original typography is maintained in the above quotation and in the quotations below.

An accident occurred on 9 February 1897 during the reconstruction while a gang of 17 workmen were working below the viaduct superstructure on a platform that collapsed, throwing 12 of the men  to their deaths. They were working in the seventh span; cross-girders had been installed and they were positioning a longitudinal wrought iron rail-bearer, moving it by hand with one end supported on the viaduct pier. The rail-bearer was 20 feet long. The "platform" they were working on, spanning that gap, was supported by a second-hand timber beam formerly used as a main structural member in one of the other spans; it had several notches cut out (for its former use) and there was decay at the slenderest point. The supervising engineer said a chain should have been used to support the centre, to take part of the load of the men and the rail-bearer.

The inquest statements throw an interesting light on the working methods of the day:

Samuel Stephens, railway labourer, Liskeard, said he had been employed on Coldrenick-viaduct since the summer. The scaffolding which fell had been erected some weeks. At the time of the accident there were 13 men actually bearing on the platform which collapsed. There were about 17 men taking part in the work of removing the girder. As the girder was pushed forward more men came to the front bearing on the span which collapsed. When the men in front had the girder on their shoulders the weight on the platform would be increased. He and 12 other men were carrying the girder on their shoulders, one end being supported by the pier of the viaduct. Just as the other end of the girder was approaching a cross-girder on which it was intended to rest it the staging suddenly collapsed and 12 of the gang fell into the valley beneath.

P. C. Ball said he had examined the spar which gave way. It was 22ft. long and 8in. by 6in. in size, but pieces had been cut out of it. At one place there was an indentation 9in. by 4in. wide. At another place 2ft. away was another cut 30in. long and 2in. or 3in. wide. Another indentation was 48in. long. The break was in about the centre of the cut. The beam was reduced here to 5½in. thick, and just at this point there was a flaw in the span, the wood being decayed.

The jury after a long consultation found that the death of the 12 men was due to the fall of the platform that negligence was shown by the foreman Blewett in not causing chains to be used in constructing the platform, and also by the ganger Pearse in selecting defective timber for constructing the platform. They also found that Blewett and Pearse feloniously caused the death of the men.The Times, London, 11 February 1897, The Serious Viaduct Accident

Trevido

It was replaced by a new stone viaduct on 14 September 1898. An accident happened on 15 November 1897 during this reconstruction work. A rope gave way while five men were hoisting a wooden beam up onto the new viaduct. One of them let go of his rope too soon, as a result the beam swung free and knocked two of the gang to their deaths.

Cartuther

It was replaced by a new stone viaduct on 8 January 1882.

Bolitho

It was rebuilt as a stone viaduct in 1882.

Liskeard
Milepost 264.5, at the east end of Liskeard station. Since 25 February 1901 the Looe branch line has passed beneath this viaduct.

It was rebuilt by raising the brick piers and replacing the timber with iron girders in 1894. These girders were renewed in steel in 1929.

Viaducts from Liskeard to Bodmin Road

Moorswater

John Binding, in his study of Brunel's Cornish Viaducts, thought that Moorswater, by virtue of its size and location, was surely the most spectacular.

In 1855 two of the piers then under construction collapsed. Brunel inspected them and rebuilt them the following year to his original design. Instead of the usual metal tie rods between the tops of the piers, this viaduct was fitted with timber ties; vertical timber baulks were fitted at the corners of some piers.

 It was replaced by a new eight-arch stone viaduct with cast iron parapets on 25 February 1881. During this work H.G. Cole, the resident engineer, was killed when a steam crane fell over. Six of the old piers still stand alongside the new viaduct, but the weakest piers were taken down before they collapsed. The new viaduct and the remaining piers of the original structure were listed Grade II* on 26 November 1985.

The line that runs below this viaduct is the Liskeard and Looe Railway. To the south can be seen  while to the north is the remains of Moorswater yard, still used by freight trains. Beyond this the Liskeard and Caradon Railway used to rise up onto the hills to serve various granite quarries.

Westwood

It was replaced by a new stone viaduct on 14 December 1879. The quarry to the south of the railway provided stone for both the building and later rebuilding many of the viaducts in Cornwall.

St Pinnock

It was rebuilt by raising the piers and replacing the timber with iron girders in 1882. This is the tallest viaduct on the Cornwall Railway. The line was singled over this viaduct on 24 May 1964 to reduce the load on the structure. This was listed Grade II in 1985.

Largin

It was rebuilt by raising the piers and replacing the timber with iron girders on 16 January 1886. The line was singled over this viaduct on 24 May 1964 to reduce the load on the structure.

West Largin

It was replaced by a new stone viaduct on 26 September 1875. This was listed Grade II in 1985.

Draw Wood

It was replaced by an embankment and stone retaining wall in 1875.

Derrycombe

It was replaced by a new stone viaduct on 8 May 1881. The new viaduct and the remaining piers of the original structure were listed Grade II in 1985.

Clinnick

It was replaced by a new stone viaduct with an iron parapet on 16 March 1879. The new viaduct and the remaining piers of the original structure were listed Grade II in 1985.

Penadlake

This was listed Grade II in 1985.

Viaducts from Lostwithiel to Truro

Lostwithiel

An  wrought iron bridge with six  timber approach spans. The date of replacement is uncertain.

Milltown

Par

A  five-arch stone viaduct to carry the line over a tramway, river and canal near Par Harbour. This was the only stone built viaduct on the line when it opened in 1859. It is known locally as the 'Five Arches'.

St Austell

It was built on a curve and crosses the road to Bodmin at an angle. The pier next to this road had to be built to an unusual triangular plan to fit this unusual configuration. The viaduct was replaced by a new stone viaduct in 1899. This sprung from the same point at the St Austell end before taking up an adjacent alignment. This meant that the northern half of the new viaduct was built first, the timber structure dismantled, and then the southern side completed.

The viaduct is referred to as Trenance Viaduct on Ordnance Survey maps.

Gover

It was replaced by a new stone viaduct in 1898. This viaduct and the remaining piers of the original structure were listed Grade II in 1988.

Coombe St Stephens

It was replaced by a new stone viaduct on 11 July 1886. The surviving piers from Brunel's viaduct were listed Grade II in 1988.

Fal

It was replaced by a new stone viaduct on 24 August 1884.

Probus
Probus and Ladock Halt was opened a quarter of a mile east of the viaduct site on 1 February 1908. 

It was replaced by an embankment in 1871.

Tregarne

It was replaced by a new stone viaduct on 1 September 1901.

Tregeagle

It was replaced by a new stone viaduct on 2 February 1902.

Truro

Carvedras
Milepost 300.5, a short distance east of Truro station.

It was replaced by a new stone viaduct on 17 August 1902. The new viaduct and the remaining piers of the original structure were listed Grade II on 30 July 1993.

Viaducts from Truro to Falmouth

Penwithers

It was rebuilt as an embankment in 1926.

Ringwell

It was rebuilt as an embankment in 1933.

Carnon

The soft nature of valley floor meant that some piers had to have a foundation built for them by sinking a temporary caisson and removing the mud within it. It was replaced by a new stone viaduct on 13 August 1933.

This viaduct crossed Restronguet Creek and the Redruth and Chasewater Railway near its Devoran terminus. This disused railway line now forms part of the Mineral Tramway Trails.

Perran

It was replaced by a new stone viaduct on 24 April 1927.

Ponsanooth

It was replaced by a new stone viaduct on 7 September 1930. This is the tallest viaduct west of Truro.

Pascoe

It was replaced by an embankment in 1923.

Penryn

It was replaced by an embankment in 1923.

Collegewood

It was replaced by a new stone viaduct on 22 July 1934. This was the longest viaduct west of Truro and the last timber viaduct to be replaced in Cornwall. The piers of the original viaduct still stand and are listed Grade II.

See also

 List of railway bridges and viaducts in the United Kingdom
 Angarrack Viaduct
 Penponds Viaduct

References

Further reading
 
 
 R J Woodfin, The Cornwall Railway to its Centenary in 1959, Bradford Barton, Truro, 1972, ; Chapter V gives a detailed analysis.

External links

 Remember Falmouth: photograph of Penwithers viaduct

Bridges by Isambard Kingdom Brunel
Railway bridges in Cornwall
Railway viaducts in Cornwall